Marlos Nobre (born February 18, 1939 in Recife, Pernambuco) is a Brazilian composer. He has received commissions from numerous institutions, including the Ministry of Culture in Spain, the Free University of Music of São Paulo, the Neuchâtel Chamber Orchestra in Switzerland, The Apollon Foundation in Bremen, Germany and the Maracaibo Music Festival in Venezuela.  He has also sat on the juries of numerous international music competitions, including the Cità di Alessandria Prize, the Arthur Rubinstein Piano Master Competition and the Paloma O'Shea Santander International Piano Competition.

His eclectic compositional style features a mixture of classical compositional techniques such as polytonality, atonality and serialism combined with stylistic and conceptual influences from Brazilian traditional and popular music.His diverse approach to composition has been enhanced through his studies of prominent composers, including Koellreutter, Garnieri, Ginastera, Messiaen, Dellapiccola, and Bernstein.

Education
Nobre studied piano and music theory at the Conservatory of Music of Pernambuco from 1948 to 1959, and composition with H. J. Koellreutter and Camargo Guarnieri. When he received a scholarship from the Rockefeller Foundation, he pursued advanced studies at the Latin American Center in Buenos Aires, alongside Ginastera, Messiaen, Malipiero, Copland and Dallapiccola. He worked also with Alexander Goehr and Gunther Schuller at the Berkshire Music Center in Tanglewood in 1969, where he met Leonard Bernstein. The same year he studied electronic music at the Columbia-Princeton Electronic Music Center in New York.

Career highlights
He was composer-in-residence at the Brahms-Haus in Baden-Baden invited by the Brahms Society, Germany from 1980–81.  He held the Guggenheim Fellowship in 1985–86.

Nobre has been a Visiting Professor at Yale, the Universities of Indiana, Arizona and Oklahoma and the Juilliard School. He was Music Director of the Radio MEC and the National Symphony Orchestra from 1971 to 1976, the First Director of the National Institute of Music at FUNARTE from 1976 to 1979, and the President of the Brazilian Academy of Music. He was also President of the International Music Council of UNESCO.

He was Guest Composer at the University of Georgia and Texas Christian University.  In 2000, he received the highest academic awards from the Texas Christian University the "Cecil and Ida Green Honors Professor" and from the Indiana University the "Thomas Hart Benton Medallion".

Compositions

The Desafio No. 3 for violin and strings is among 16 compositions by Nobre for various combinations of instruments that draw on the concept of the "desafio". In Brazilian culture, a "desafio" is a musical duel between two singers known as repentistas sertanejos (lit. country singers) who playfully and competitively alternate improvised poetic lyrics while accompanying themselves on guitar. The "desafio" tradition is particularly common in the Brazilian northeast and typically takes place at a public square or local market. Desafio No. 3 is a dialogue between the violin soloist and string orchestra, ant the piece reflects the modal, lyrical, and conversational nature of the music of the Brazilian repentistas.

Recent years
Nobre is active as a pianist and conductor, having performed and conducted with several orchestras: Suisse Romande Orchestra, Geneve; Collegium Academicum, Switzerland; Buenos Aires Philharmonic Orchestra at Teatro Colón; SODRE Orchestra of Montevideo, Uruguay; the National Orchestras of Portugal, Spain, Mexico, Venezuela, Peru (National Symphony Orchestra of Peru), Guatemala and all Brazilian Orchestra; the Royal Philharmonic Orchestra, London; Philharmonic of Nice, France.

He is currently the Director of Contemporary Music Programs at Radio MEC-FM of Brazil; the President of "Jeunesses Musicales" of Brazil and the President of the Musica Nova Editions of Brazil. Miembro de Número del Colegio de Compositores Latinoamericanos de Música de Arte, fundado por el compositor y director de orquesta Manuel de Elías.

Awards
Nobre won a number of composers' competitions, including:
 Music and Musicians of Brazil, Rio de Janeiro (1960)
 Broadcasting Music Inc. Award, New York, USA (1961)
 The Brazilian Song Contest, Rio de Janeiro (1962)
 Ernesto Nazareth National Competition, Brazilian Academy of Music, Rio de Janeiro (1963)
 National Composers Contest, Federal University of Rio de Janeiro (1963)
 Torcuato Di Tella Award, Buenos Aires (1963)
 City of Santos Contest, São Paulo (1966)
 The UNESCO Prize, Paris (1974)
 The I TRIMALCA/UNESCO Prize, Colombia (1979)
 VI Premio Iberoamerican de la Música "Tomás Luís de Victoria", (2005)

He has received the following decorations:
 Cultural Merit Gold Medal of Pernambuco (1978)
 Great Official of the Order of Merit of Brasília (1988)
 Official of the Order of Rio Branco of the Itamaraty, Brazil (1989)
 Official of the Order of Arts and Letters of France (1994)
 Gold Medal of Merit of the Joaquim Nabuco Foundation of Pernambuco (1999)

References

External links
POESIA&MÚSICA – SONORIDADES BRASILEIRAS

Further reading
 A bibliography of interviews and articles about Nobre
 Brown, Royal S. "An Interview with Marlos Nobre." Fanfare — The Magazine for Serious Record Collectors 18:1 (September–October 1994) p. 60–65.
 Llorente, Juan Antonio. "Con nombre propio: Marlos Nobre." Scherzo — Revista de Música. 21:209 (June 2006). p. 8–10. Biographical article in Spanish.

1939 births
Living people
Brazilian composers
Brazilian conductors (music)
Brazilian pianists
People from Recife
21st-century conductors (music)
21st-century pianists
Pupils of Aaron Copland